Glyptothorax silviae is a species of catfish in genus Glyptothorax, family Sisoridae and order Siluriformes.
It is a Freshwater, benthopelagic, Subtropical fish endemic to the Shatt al-Arab and Karun rivers in Iran and Tigris in Iraq.

Sources
Coad, B.W., 1998. Systematic biodiversity in the freshwater fishes of Iran. Ital. J. Zool. 65:101-108. (Ref. 31728)

silviae
Fish of Iran
Taxa named by Brian W. Coad
Fish described in 1981